The 2015–16 Ukrainian Second League was the 25th season of 3rd level professional football in Ukraine. The competition commenced on 26 July 2015 with a full round of matches. From 1 November 2015 to 26 March 2016 the competition was on winter break. The competition resumed with Round 16 and completed on 1 June 2016.

Team changes

Admitted teams
The following teams were admitted by the PFL after playing in the 2015 Ukrainian Football Amateur League  and passing attestation.

FC Myr Hornostayivka – initial group stage (returning after an absence of one season)
FC Kolos Kovalivka – intermediate group stage (debut)
FC Barsa Sumy – initial group stage (two seasons before) (debut)
FC Inhulets Petrove – intermediate group stage (debut) 

FC Arsenal-Kyiv – (debut)
FC Arsenal-Kyiv is regarded as a successor of FC Arsenal Kyiv which 22 years ago as FC Borysfen Boryspil participated in the Second League.
NK Veres Rivne – (returning after an absence of four seasons)
 NK Veres Rivne is regarded as a successor of FC Veres Rivne.

Relegated teams
FSC Bukovyna Chernivtsi – (returning after an absence of five seasons)

Withdrawn teams

Shakhtar-3 Donetsk withdrew from the PFL before the start of the 2015–16 season.

Relocated teams

Real Pharma moved their operations from Ovidiopol to Odesa prior to the start of the season.

Renamed teams
FC Nikopol-NPHU – Prior to the start of the season FC NPHU-Makiyivvuhillya Nikopol formally withdrew from the PFL and then reentered under their new name.

Location map 
The following displays the location of teams.

League table

Results

Round by round
The following table represents the teams position after each round in the competition.

Top goalscorers

Notes:

See also
 2015–16 Ukrainian Premier League
 2015–16 Ukrainian First League
 2015–16 Ukrainian Cup

References

Ukrainian Second League seasons
3
Ukraine